Dubia Open may refer to:
 Dubai Open (golf) – a 2014 Asian Tour event
 Dubai Tennis Championships – a tennis tournament
 Dubai Open Chess Tournament – an annual chess tournament
 Dubai Open Squash – a Professional Squash Association tournament
 Dubai Open Cube – an annual event held by the World Cube Association